Slavyanka may refer to:

Slavyanka (mountain), a mountain in Bulgaria and Greece
Slavyanka, Azerbaijan, a village in Gadabay Rayon of Azerbaijan
Slavyanka, Russia, name of several inhabited localities in Russia
Slavyanka (river), a tributary of the Neva in Leningrad Oblast, Russia
Slavyanka, Saskatchewan, a defunct Doukhobor village near Blaine Lake, Saskatchewan, Canada
Slavyanka, alternative name of the Russian River in California, United States
Slavianka (clothing), a Belarusian firm
Slavyanka Beach, a geographic feature in Antarctica

See also
Farewell of Slavianka, a Russian march
Petro-Slavyanka, a municipal settlement in Kolpinsky District of Saint Petersburg, Russia